The 1986 NCAA Division I softball season, play of college softball in the United States organized by the National Collegiate Athletic Association (NCAA) at the Division I level, began in February 1986.  The season progressed through the regular season, many conference tournaments and championship series, and concluded with the 1986 NCAA Division I softball tournament and 1986 Women's College World Series.  The Women's College World Series, consisting of the eight remaining teams in the NCAA Tournament and held in Omaha, Nebraska at Seymour Smith Park, ended on May 25, 1986.

Conference standings

Women's College World Series
The 1986 NCAA Women's College World Series took place May 21–25, 1986 in Omaha, Nebraska.

Season leaders
Batting
Batting average: .453 – Jackie Nietopski, Niagara Purple Eagles
RBIs: 41 – Debbi Oraczewski, Towson Tigers, Jeanne Weinsheim, San Diego Toreros & Melanie Marshall, Tennessee Tech Golden Eagles
Home runs: 10 – Debbi Oraczewski, Towson Tigers

Pitching
Wins: 35-9 – Stacey Johnson, Louisiana Tech Lady Techsters
ERA: 0.18 (4 ER/153.1 IP) – Connie Clark, Cal State Fullerton Titans
Strikeouts: 370 – Amy Unterbrink, Indiana Hoosiers

Records
NCAA Division I season WHIP:
0.36 (58 H+13 BB/195.0 IP) – Virginia Augusta, North Carolina Tar Heels

NCAA Division I single game triples:
3 – Lynna Hallick, Northwestern Wildcats; April 18, 1986

Junior class perfect games:
3 – Virginia Augusta, North Carolina Tar Heels

Team single game triples:
7 – UMass Minutewomen; March 17, 1986

Awards
Honda Sports Award Softball:
Susan LeFebvre, Cal State Fullerton Titans

All America Teams
The following players were members of the first All-American Teams.

First Team

Second Team

References